Vladimir Vyacheslavovich Belokurov (July 8, 1904 – January 28, 1973) was a Soviet and Russian actor and pedagogue. He was a People's Artist of the USSR (1965) and won the Stalin Prize of the second degree.

Selected filmography

 The House of the Dead (1932) as Stammering Announcer
 Dawn of Paris (1937) as Prosecutor Rigot
 Valery Chkalov (1941) as Valery Chkalov
 Sabuhi (1941) as Bestujev
 Military Secret (1945) as Peter Weininger, aka Petrov, aka Petronescu
 The Village Teacher (1947) as Bukov - kulak
 Zhukovsky (1950) as Sergey Chaplygin
 Secret Mission (1950) as Bormann
 Belinsky (1953) as Barsukov
 Silvery Dust (1953) as Upton Bruce
 A Fortress in the Mountains (1953) as Morrow
 The Great Warrior Skanderbeg (1953) as King
 The Boys from Leningrad (1954) as Vasiliy Tsvetkov, rezhisyor
 Mikhaylo Lomonosov (1955) as Prokop Andreevitch
 Son (1955) as Lavrov
 A Weary Road (1956) as Latkin
 Duel (1957) as Dits
 Shli soldaty (1958)
 Lavina s gor (1959) as Ataman Shkuro
 Khmuroe utro (1959) as Lyova Zadov
 Vasily Surikov (1959) as Kuznetsov
 Dead Souls (1960) as Chichikov
 Resurrection (1960) as Maslennikov
 Ryzhik (1961)
 Striped Trip (1961) as boatswain
 Flower on the Stone (1962) as father of Christina
 Queen of the Gas Station (1963) as Medved
 Moskva - Genuya (1964) as David Lloyd-George
 Across the Cemetery (1964) as Sazon Ivanovich Kulik
 Poka front v oborone (1965) as Shorokhov
 The Salvos of the Aurora Cruiser (1965) as Ministr
 Alpine Ballad (1966) as Austrian
 They're Calling, Open the Door (1966) as Sergey Korkin
 Ya rodom iz detstva (1966)
 The Elusive Avengers (1967) as Otets-filosof
 Zapomnim etot den (1968) as Gavrila Semyonovich Ravinskiy
 The New Adventures of the Elusive Avengers (1968) as bandit, named "holy father-philosopher"
 Neposyedy (1968) as Thief
 Oshibka Onore de Balzaka (1969) as Zaritskiy
 Däli Kür (1969) as Semyonov
 Paytyun kesgisherits heto (1969)
 Crime and Punishment (1970) as innkeeper (uncredited)
 Poslanniki vechnosti (1971) as Minister
 Krusheniye imperii (1971) as Kucherov
 Synovya ukhodyat v boy (1971)
 Voyna pod kryshami (1971)
 The Crown of the Russian Empire, or Once Again the Elusive Avengers (1971) as bandit, named "holy father-philosopher"
 Rudobelskaya respublika (1971) as Revinsky
 Chipollino (1973) as Tomato (final film role)

References

External links

1904 births
1973 deaths
20th-century Russian male actors
Academic staff of the Gerasimov Institute of Cinematography
Honored Artists of the RSFSR
People's Artists of the RSFSR
People's Artists of the USSR
Stalin Prize winners
Recipients of the Order of the Red Banner of Labour
Russian male film actors
Russian male stage actors
Russian male television actors
Russian male voice actors
Soviet male film actors
Soviet male stage actors
Soviet male television actors
Soviet male voice actors
Burials at Novodevichy Cemetery